Fall Creek State Recreation Site is a state park in the U.S. state of Oregon, administered by the Oregon Parks and Recreation Department. The park includes 47 campsites that do not include many luxuries. Each site includes a picnic table and a fire ring. There is also a designated swimming area in the lake that Fall Creek flows into. A dock and boat ramp are on the lake as well.

See also
 List of Oregon state parks

References

External links
 

State parks of Oregon
Parks in Lane County, Oregon